Ashley Soan is a British drummer. His influences include Stewart Copeland, Steve Ferrone, Jim Keltner, James Gadson, Phil Rudd, Art Blakey, Steve Gadd.

Early life
Educated at the Grove School In Market Drayton, Shropshire, Ashley Soan started having lessons at an early age with Brian Stone and then with Andy Richards. He studied music at Salford University and then went on to study at Drumtech (now BIMM London & formally Tech Music School) in Fulham, London.

Career
Soan's first break was a short stint with Tom Robinson and then in 1994 joined the band Del Amitri. He toured and recorded as a member of that band and left Del Amitri in 1997, and subsequently joined Faithless, then went on to tour and record with Squeeze, staying with them until their break-up in 1999.

He has done varied session work since, including touring with Will Young,  Tom McRae, Lisa Stansfield, Rick Wakeman, Belinda Carlisle, Chris Difford and Glenn Tilbrook (of Squeeze) and recording with Cee Lo Green, Adele, Clare Maguire, Will Young, Brian McFadden, Delta Goodrem, Vex Red, Pete Lawrie, the Robbie Williams and Gary Barlow single "Shame", Enrique Iglesias, Ronan Keating, Marianne Faithfull, Natasha Bedingfield, James Morrison (Songs for You, Truths for Me and the single, "Broken Strings"), Will Young (Let It Go), Alesha Dixon, Boyzone, Dua Lipa and Alicia Keys, Eros Ramazzotti.

Soan is a member of Producers/The Trevor Horn Band along with Trevor Horn, Steve Lipson and Lol Creme. He continues to work on further projects produced by Horn, including with Robbie Williams on his November 2009 release, Reality Killed the Video Star. He also works with Horn's former Buggles partner Geoff Downes, including on the Downes Braide Association's 2017 album Skyscraper Souls. Soan's most recent recording work includes Cher, Billy Idol, Mark Owen and The Wanted.

As of 2020, Soan is again a member of Del Amitri, having recorded drums for the group's album Fatal Mistakes, which was released on 28 May 2021.

On 30 October 2021 Tori Amos announced that Ash Soan would be joining her on her 2022 tour for her 16th album, Ocean to Ocean.

References

External links
 Official webpage
 Interview
 Ash Soan on Twitter

Year of birth missing (living people)
Living people
English rock drummers
British session musicians
Del Amitri members
Squeeze (band) members
Alumni of the University of Salford
The Trevor Horn Band members